Robert Louis Stevenson Branch Library is a branch library of the Los Angeles Public Library located in the Boyle Heights section of Los Angeles, California.  It was built in 1927 based on a Spanish Colonial Revival design by architect George L. Lindsay.

History 
In 1987, the Stevenson Branch and several other branch libraries in Los Angeles were added to the National Register of Historic Places as part of a thematic group submission.   The application noted that the branch libraries had been constructed in a variety of period revival styles to house the initial branch library system of the City of Los Angeles.

Whittier Narrows Earthquake and Reconstruction 
The Branch was temporarily closed in 1987 due to the Whittier Narrows Earthquake, along with 6 other L.A. branch libraries. The structural damage reported totaled approximately $32,000. On July 28, 1988, while the building was closed for repairs, the branch was moved to a temporary location on 3500 Whittier Blvd, Los Angeles. Through the relocation process, over ten thousand volumes of books were moved from the damaged library to the temporary location. Funding from the City of Los Angeles Community Development Department was used by Martinez-Hirsch Associates to design and lead the renovation and expansion of the damaged building. Although the library officials expected to be at the temporary location for many years, the library was re-opened on July 3, 1991.

See also

List of Registered Historic Places in Los Angeles
Los Angeles Public Library

References

External links
 Robert Louis Stevenson Branch Library - Los Angeles Public Library
 "Honor library", East L.A. Gasette, Feb. 24, 1957

Library buildings completed in 1927
Libraries in Los Angeles
Libraries on the National Register of Historic Places in Los Angeles
Spanish Colonial Revival architecture in California
Boyle Heights, Los Angeles